The Mekong snail-eating turtle (Malayemys subtrijuga) is a species of turtle in the family Geoemydidae. It was monotypic within the genus Malayemys until Brophy (2004, 2005) reevaluated (based on morphology) Malayemys macrocephala (Gray, 1859), which has been long time considered to be a synonym of M. subtrijuga.

Distribution
The Mekong snail-eating turtle is found in the Mekong River basin of Cambodia, Laos, southern Vietnam, and Thailand and the northern Malay Peninsula, and Java, Indonesia. It could have been introduced to Java via human intervention from the Mekong River Basin. The occurrence of the species in Indonesia is regarded by Brophy (2005) to be allochthonous, i.e., non-native (Sumatra) or extinct (Java)

References

Geoemydidae
Reptiles described in 1845
Reptiles of Cambodia
Reptiles of Laos
Reptiles of Thailand
Reptiles of Vietnam
Taxonomy articles created by Polbot